Andries Hendrik Snyman (born 2 February 1974) is a South African rugby union former player and current coach. His usual position was inside centre, but he had success on the wing at international level. Snyman earned 38 test caps for the South Africa national rugby union team, before retiring from playing in 2007. Snyman has been coaching rugby in the United States since 2011.

Playing career

Snyman was born  in Newcastle, South Africa. Snyman made his Springbok debut in 1996 against the All Blacks in Durban. He went on to play 38 times for the Springboks and played his final international test match against Scotland in June 2006. Snyman joined English club Leeds Tykes for the 2003 season. During his time at Leeds he helped them win the 2004–05 Powergen Cup, in the final of which he scored a try. He later moved to France, signing with USA Perpignan for the 2006–07 season. However, Snyman returned to the Tykes on loan in December 2006 in order to help their National Division One campaign. He made his debut for the Tykes against Northampton, the same day England won the 2003 Rugby World Cup. He scored one of the Leeds tries in the famous Powergen Cup Final against Bath, intercepting a pass from 80 m. Snyman finally retired from professional rugby at the end of the 2007 season.

In 2012 and 2013, Snyman represented the United States of America at the Rugby World Classics Tournament in Bermuda.

Snyman represented the South African sevens team at the 1997 Rugby World Cup Sevens in Hong Kong where they lost to Fiji in the final, 24–21.

Test history

Coaching career
Snyman moved to the United States in 2011 and helped coach the Glendale Raptors, 2011's D1 club champions. In 2012, Snyman assumed the role of head coach. In 2014, Snyman led Glendale to an 11–1 regular-season record and into the finals of the Pacific Rugby Premiership, where they lost to San Francisco Golden Gate. 
In 2015, Snyman and the Glendale Raptors won the Pacific Rugby Premiership Championship, beating San Francisco Golden Gate, 25-11, after going 9-3 in regular season. Snyman was named Coach of the Pacific Rugby Premiership by This Is American Rugby for the second year running in 2015. In 2016, Snyman and the Glendale Raptors won the Pacific Rugby Premiership, once again beating San Francisco Golden Gate, 44-20, making them back to back Pacific Rugby Premiership Champions.

Snyman was also used as a defensive specialist for the USA Sevens team under head coach Matt Hawkins.

Snyman formally coached Hill House School where he was the head of rugby and was accompanied by Chris Rose.

Honours
Powergen Cup/Anglo-Welsh Cup titles: 1
2005

See also
List of South Africa national rugby union players – Springbok no. 636

References

External links
 Andre Snyman on sporting-heroes.net
 Andre Snyman on ercrugby.com

1974 births
Living people
South African rugby union coaches
South African rugby union players
South Africa international rugby union players
Rugby union centres
Leeds Tykes players
Bulls (rugby union) players
Blue Bulls players
Sharks (rugby union) players
Sharks (Currie Cup) players
South Africa international rugby sevens players
Male rugby sevens players
Tshwane University of Technology alumni
Rugby union players from Newcastle, KwaZulu-Natal